Too Far may refer to:

Too Far Steven Universe episode
Too Far
Too Far, Rich Shapero project
"Too Far", B-side of Ruby (Adam Wade song) 1960